In hydrology, discharge is the volumetric flow rate of water that is transported through a given cross-sectional area. It includes any suspended solids (e.g. sediment), dissolved chemicals (e.g. CaCO3(aq)), or biologic material (e.g. diatoms) in addition to the water itself. Terms may vary between disciplines. For example, a fluvial hydrologist studying natural river systems may define discharge as streamflow, whereas an engineer operating a reservoir system may equate it with outflow, contrasted with inflow.

Theory and calculation
A discharge is a measure of the quantity of any fluid flow over unit time. The quantity may be either volume or mass. Thus the water discharge of a tap (faucet) can be measured with a measuring jug and a stopwatch. Here the discharge might be 1 litre per 15 seconds, equivalent to 67 ml/second or 4 litres/minute. This is an average measure. For measuring the discharge of a river we need a different method and the most common is the 'area-velocity' method. The area is the cross sectional area across a river and the average velocity across that section needs to be measured for a unit time, commonly a minute. Measurement of cross sectional area and average velocity, although simple in concept, are frequently non-trivial to determine.

The units that are typically used to express discharge in streams or rivers include m3/s (cubic meters per second), ft3/s (cubic feet per second or cfs) and/or acre-feet per day.

A commonly applied methodology for measuring, and estimating, the discharge of a river is based on a simplified form of the continuity equation.  The equation implies that for any incompressible fluid, such as liquid water, the discharge (Q) is equal to the product of the stream's cross-sectional area (A) and its mean velocity, and is written as:

where
 is the discharge ([L3T−1]; m3/s or ft3/s)
 is the cross-sectional area of the portion of the channel occupied by the flow ([L2]; m2 or ft2)
 is the average flow velocity ([LT−1]; m/s or ft/s)

Because of the difficulties of measurement, a stream gauge is often used at a fixed location on the stream or river.

Hydrograph

Catchment discharge

The catchment of a river above a certain location is determined by the surface area of all land which drains toward the river from above that point.  The river's discharge at that location depends on the rainfall on the catchment or drainage area and the inflow or outflow of groundwater to or from the area, stream modifications such as dams and irrigation diversions, as well as evaporation and evapotranspiration from the area's land and plant surfaces. In storm hydrology, an important consideration is the stream's discharge hydrograph, a record of how the discharge varies over time after a precipitation event.  The stream rises to a peak flow after each precipitation event, then falls in a slow recession.  Because the peak flow also corresponds to the maximum water level reached during the event, it is of interest in flood studies.  Analysis of the relationship between precipitation intensity and duration and the response of the stream discharge are aided by the concept of the unit hydrograph, which represents the response of stream discharge over time to the application of a hypothetical "unit" amount and duration of rainfall (e.g., half an inch over one hour).  The amount of precipitation correlates to the volume of water (depending on the area of the catchment) that subsequently flows out of the river. Using the unit hydrograph method, actual historical rainfalls can be modeled mathematically to confirm characteristics of historical floods, and hypothetical "design storms" can be created for comparison to observed stream responses.

The relationship between the discharge in the stream at a given cross-section and the level of the stream is described by a rating curve.  Average velocities and the cross-sectional area of the stream are measured for a given stream level.  The velocity and the area give the discharge for that level.  After measurements are made for several different levels, a rating table or rating curve may be developed.  Once rated, the discharge in the stream may be determined by measuring the level, and determining the corresponding discharge from the rating curve. If a continuous level-recording device is located at a rated cross-section, the stream's discharge may be continuously determined.

Larger flows (higher discharges) can transport more sediment and larger particles downstream than smaller flows due to their greater force. Larger flows can also erode stream banks and damage public infrastructure.

Catchment effects on discharge and morphology
G. H. Dury and M. J. Bradshaw are two geographers who devised models showing the relationship between discharge and other variables in a river. The Bradshaw model described how pebble size and other variables change from source to mouth; while Dury considered the relationships between discharge and variables such as stream slope and friction. These follow from the ideas presented by Leopold, Wolman and Miller in Fluvial Processes in Geomorphology. and on land use affecting river discharge and bedload supply.

Inflow and the Hydrologic Cycle 

Inflow is a process within the hydrologic cycle that helps maintain the water levels within all bodies of water.

The hydrologic cycle, or water cycle, has no true starting point. However, it’s easiest to start with the ocean, as the ocean makes up the majority of Earth’s water. The sun is the main aspect of the hydrologic cycle, as it is responsible for warming the water and causing evaporation. As water evaporates into the air and the rising air currents take the evaporated water into the atmosphere. Once the evaporated water reaches high enough in the atmosphere, it reaches cooler temperatures, which cause the vapor to condense into clouds.

Air currents are capable of moving clouds around the globe, but typically cloud particles collide and fall out of the sky as precipitation. Even though precipitation can fall in many forms and in many locations, most precipitations either ends up back into a body of water or on land as surface runoff. A portion of runoff enters back into streams and rivers, which over time lead back to the ocean. Another portion of runoff soaks into the ground as groundwater seepage, and are stored in freshwater lakes. The other portion of runoff soaks into the ground as infiltration, some of this water will infiltrate deep into the ground and replenish aquifers.

So how does inflow play a role in the hydrologic cycle? Inflow is the adding of water to the different aspects of the hydrologic system. Consequently, outflow is the removal of water from the hydrological cycle. Inflow adds water to different aspects of the hydrologic cycle that returns water storage to an even level. Water storage is the retention of water throughout different aspects of the hydrologic cycle. Due to the fact that water movement is cyclical, inflow, outflow, and storage are all aspects of the hydrologic cycle.

Inflow = Outflow +/- Changes in Storage

See also
 List of rivers by discharge
 Groundwater discharge
 Submarine groundwater discharge
 Stream gauge

References

External links

Hydrology
Rivers
Temporal rates